Eine Couch für alle is an Austrian television series.

See also 
 List of Austrian television series

External links 
 

Austrian television series
2010 Austrian television series debuts
2010 Austrian television series endings
2010s Austrian television series
German-language television shows